Alexei Pavlovich Kaigorodov (born July 29, 1983) is a Russian former professional ice hockey forward who last played with Metallurg Magnitogorsk of the Kontinental Hockey League (KHL).

Playing career
Alexei Kaigorodov started his professional career with Metallurg Magnitogorsk of the then Russian Super League (RSL) in 2001, where he played for five seasons. On August 24, 2006, Kaigorodov's contract was voluntarily suspended by Magnitogorsk, allowing him to pursue an NHL contract. Soon after, he signed a two-year contract with the Ottawa Senators. The Senators were searching for a "second-line centre" to take offensive pressure off the Senators top line and hoped that Kaigorodov would be able to do that. He attended training camp and remained with the club, but played only six games before being demoted to the Binghamton Senators of the American Hockey League (AHL). He refused to report and returned to Russia.

On November 4, 2006, he was suspended by the Senators. On January 3, 2007, his NHL rights were traded to the Phoenix Coyotes for Mike Comrie. While Kaigorodov plays in Russia he remains on the suspended list of the Coyotes. Kaigorodov returned to Magnitogorsk and is an active member as of the 2008–09 season.

In the 2015–16 season, Kaigorodov having left Salavat Yulaev Ufa signed a one-year contract with Barys Astana. He contributed with only 4 assists in 23 games before he was traded to HC Dynamo Moscow on November 4, 2015. Kaigorodov's struggles continued in Moscow, producing just 1 assist in 7 games before he was released from his contract. On December 15, 2015, he made another return to hometown club, Metallurg Magnitogorsk, agreeing to terms for the remainder of the campaign.

Career statistics

Regular season and playoffs

International

References

External links
 

1983 births
Living people
Barys Nur-Sultan players
HC Dynamo Moscow players
Metallurg Magnitogorsk players
Ottawa Senators draft picks
Ottawa Senators players
Russian ice hockey centres
Salavat Yulaev Ufa players
Sportspeople from Chelyabinsk